Sir Thomas Dyke Acland, 10th Baronet (29 March 1787 – 22 July 1871) was a British politician and baronet.

Background
Born in London, he was the eldest son of Sir Thomas Dyke Acland, 9th Baronet and his wife Henrietta Anne Hoare, daughter of Sir Richard Hoare, 1st Baronet. The Aclands were an old Devon family and successive generations of the family sat in the House of Commons for the county. His family had extensive properties on what is now the Holnicote Estate and particularly the village of Selworthy. In 1794, he succeeded his father as baronet. Acland was educated at Harrow School and Christ Church, Oxford and graduated with a Bachelor of Arts in 1808, and a Master of Arts in 1814. He gained a Doctor of Civil Laws degree in 1831.

Career

He was appointed High Sheriff of Devon for 1809–10. Although the Aclands were usually associated with the Liberal Party, this Acland was a Tory. He was the Member of Parliament (MP) for Devonshire from 1812 to 1818 and again from 1820 to 1831. He then sat for North Devon from 1837 to 1857.

Among his many business interests Acland was the owner of a schooner called Lady of St Kilda, which he bought in 1834. It was named for the remote Scottish archipelago he visited with his wife in 1812 when he made the earliest extant sketches of the old clachan. 

On the maiden voyage of his new yacht in 1834 he again visited the islands, leaving twenty gold sovereigns with the minister to assist in the building of new houses, which was later matched by their improving Landlord, Lt Col MacLeod of Skye.  In 1842 the schooner visited the township of Melbourne in Australia, which had been founded in 1835. 

As a result of that visit, the suburb of St Kilda was named after the ship, and Acland Street, one of St Kilda's main commercial centres, was named after Acland.

Family
In 1808, he married Lydia Elizabeth Hoare, daughter of the banker Henry Hoare of Mitcham Grove, and had issue.

 Lydia Dorothea Acland (d. 14 Mar 1858)
 Agnes Lucy Acland (1822-23 May 1895)
 Sir Thomas Dyke Acland, 7th/11th Bt. (25 May 1809 – 29 May 1898)
 Arthur Henry Dyke Acland (3 May 1811 – 19 Jun 1857) In 1852 he changed his name to Troyte as a condition of inheriting the Huntsham estate.
 Lt. Charles Baldwin Dyke Acland (1812–1837)
 Sir Henry Wentworth Acland, 1st Bt. (23 Aug 1815 – 16 Oct 1900) (New baronetcy created)
 Reverend Peter Leopold Dyke Acland (3 Jun 1819 – 24 Oct 1899)
John Barton Arundell Acland (25 Nov 1823 – 18 May 1904)
 Dudley Reginald Dyke Acland (1828–1837)

References

Thomas Dyke Acland, 10th baronet at Dyk.de

External links 
 

1787 births
1871 deaths
Thomas Dyke 1787
People educated at Harrow School
Alumni of Christ Church, Oxford
Baronets in the Baronetage of England
Conservative Party (UK) MPs for English constituencies
UK MPs 1812–1818
UK MPs 1820–1826
UK MPs 1826–1830
UK MPs 1830–1831
UK MPs 1837–1841
UK MPs 1841–1847
UK MPs 1847–1852
UK MPs 1852–1857
High Sheriffs of Devon
Tory members of the Parliament of the United Kingdom
Members of the Parliament of the United Kingdom for Devon